Nematabramis borneensis is a species of cyprinid found in northern Borneo. It belongs to the genus Nematabramis.

References

Fish described in 1962
Danios
Nematabramis